The following highways are numbered 474:

Canada
Manitoba Provincial Road 474

Japan
 Japan National Route 474

United States
  Interstate 474
  County Road 474 (Lake County, Florida)
  Maryland Route 474
  New York State Route 474
  Pennsylvania Route 474
  Puerto Rico Highway 474
  Tennessee State Route 474
 Texas:
  Texas State Highway Spur 474
  Ranch to Market Road 474